Once Upon a Time in the North is a 2012 Finnish film written and directed by JP Siili. The film is about puukkojunkkaris, troublemakers who were active in the Southern Ostrobothnia region of Finland in the 19th century.

Cast 
Lauri Tilkanen as Matti  
Mikko Leppilampi as Esko 
Pamela Tola as Aino 
Aku Hirviniemi as Kalle  
Eero Milonoff as Koskela  
Esko Salminen as Antti Välitalo  
Lena Meriläinen as Maria Välitalo  
Taneli Mäkeläas Sakari Kantola  
Olavi Uusivirta as Lehto 
Pirkka-Pekka Petelius as Notary 
Kari Hietalahti as Sheriff

References

External links
 Once Upon a Time in the North at Cineuropa

Finnish drama films
2012 films
Films directed by JP Siili
Films scored by Tuomas Kantelinen
2010s Finnish-language films